Chris Gorsek (born January 28, 1958 in Portland, Oregon) is an American politician and a Democratic member of the Oregon State Senate representing District 25 since January 11, 2021.

Background
Gorsek earned his Bachelor of Science and Master of Arts from the University of Oregon, followed by a PhD from Portland State University. He is a teacher at Mt. Hood Community College, and formerly was an officer for the Portland Police Bureau.

Elections
2012 - Challenged incumbent Republican Representative Matt Wand for the District 49 seat, Gorsek was unopposed for the May 15, 2012, Democratic Primary, winning with 2,392 votes, and won the November 6, 2012, General election with 11,459 votes (54.2%) against Representative Wand.
2000 - Republican Senator John Lim was term limited (since repealed) and left the Senate District 11 seat open, Gorsek was unopposed for the May 16, 2000, Democratic Primary, winning with 7,838 votes, but lost the November 7, 2000, General election to Republican nominee John Minnis.

References

External links
 Official page at the Oregon Legislative Assembly
 Campaign site
 

1958 births
Living people
Democratic Party members of the Oregon House of Representatives
Politicians from Portland, Oregon
Portland State University alumni
University of Oregon alumni
Portland Police Bureau officers
People from Troutdale, Oregon
21st-century American politicians
Mt. Hood Community College